Llimy Rivas (born June 8, 1968) is a retired male track and field athlete from Colombia, who competed in the hurdling events during his career.

Career
He claimed the bronze medal in the men's 400 metres hurdles event at the 1995 Pan American Games in Mar del Plata, Argentina.

Achievements

References

1968 births
Living people
Colombian male hurdlers
Athletes (track and field) at the 1995 Pan American Games
Pan American Games bronze medalists for Colombia
Pan American Games medalists in athletics (track and field)
South American Games gold medalists for Colombia
South American Games bronze medalists for Colombia
South American Games medalists in athletics
Competitors at the 1994 South American Games
Medalists at the 1995 Pan American Games
Central American and Caribbean Games medalists in athletics
20th-century Colombian people